My Kind of Blues may refer to:
 My Kind of Blues (B.B. King album), 1961
 My Kind of Blues (Sam Cooke album), 1961